Mortar Board is an American national honor society for college seniors. Mortar Board has 233 chartered collegiate chapters nationwide and 15 alumni chapters.

History 
Mortar Board was the first national honor society for college senior women and continues to promote women's interests in higher education today. The organization coalesced by agreement of four local women's honor societies. Founding locals were:
 Der Hexenkreis, Cornell University
 Mortar Board, Ohio State University
 Mortarboard, University of Michigan
 Pi Sigma Chi, Swarthmore College

These and other chapters continue the tradition of adopting unique, historical or symbolic local names as their chapter designations, and do not use traditional alphabetized Greek Letter names as are common among other honor societies.

The Society was originally unnamed.

The Society grew quickly, adopting a district governance structure by 1923 when it had already grown to 18 chartered chapters.  By 1925 the Mortar Board Quarterly was established as the official publication, now called the Forum.

The Society admitted men in 1975 as a ramification of Title IX, at which point a clause was added in the Purpose to include "to promote and advance the status of women." This was further revised the following year to read, "...to emphasize the advancement of the status of women" as well as "to promote equal opportunities among all people."

Mortar Board today has 233 chapters in 45 states.

Notable alumni
More than quarter of a million members have been initiated nationwide, with established careers in numerous fields. Some of the notable alumni are:
Condoleezza Rice, former U.S. Secretary of State
Judith Resnik, space shuttle Challenger astronaut
Aron Ralston, mountain climber and author
Drew Brees, NFL player
Bruce Littlefield, author and lifestyle expert

Additionally, numerous community and international leaders have been named honorary members, including:
Sandra Day O’Connor, Supreme Court associate justice
Maya Angelou, poet
Jimmy Carter, U.S. President
Rudy Giuliani, former mayor of New York.
Sally Ride, first female U.S. astronaut
Fred Rogers, educator, minister, and host of Mister Rogers' Neighborhood

National structure 
Mortar Board, Inc. is governed by collegiate chapters. National officers come from the ranks of  alumni and collegiate members.

National Office
The National Office, located in Columbus, Ohio, is the source of records and information related to chapter operations, national conferences, alumni, the Mortar Board National Foundation and the historical archives of Mortar Board. The staff enacts policies and procedures established by the National Council and the Mortar Board National Foundation.

National Foundation
The National Foundation was established in 1955 as the fundraising arm of Mortar Board, as well as to serve the educational aims of Mortar Board, Inc. The mission of the National Foundation is to support Mortar Board, Inc. in furthering its ideals of scholarship, leadership and service.

Section coordinators
Section coordinators work directly with chapters, serving as close primary contacts for chapters within a specified geographic region. The section coordinator is available to assist the chapters with a variety of tasks, including planning and execution of events.

Affiliations 
Mortar Board is an affiliate of the Association of College Honor Societies.  Mortar Board was invited into the Association of College Honor Societies (ACHS) in 1937, the only women’s honor society to be invited up until that time. ACHS is a national organization that provides resources and fosters communication among 70 honor societies with chapters around the world.

References

External links
Mortar Board National College Senior Honor Society
  ACHS Mortar Board entry
  Mortar Board chapter list at ACHS

Association of College Honor Societies
Honor societies
Ohio State University
Organizations established in 1918